Paulo Obradović (born 9 March 1986) is a Croatian water polo player. At the 2012 Summer Olympics, he competed for the Croatia men's national water polo team in the men's event, where they won the gold medal. He is 6 ft 3 inches tall. At club level, he played for Greek powerhouse Olympiacos, with whom he won the 2017–18 LEN Champions League.

He went on loan for the summer 2018 with San Giljan A.S.C. He now plays for Jug AO.

Honours 
Jug Dubrovnik  
LEN Champions League: 2005–06, 2015–16 ; runners-up: 2006–07, 2007–08, 2016–17 
LEN Super Cup: 2006, 2016
Adriatic League: 2008–09, 2015–16, 2016–17
Croatian Championship: 2003–04, 2004–05, 2005–06 2006–07, 2008–09, 2009–10, 2010–11, 2011–12, 2015–16, 2016–17, 2019–20 
Croatian Cup: 2005–06, 2006–07, 2007–08, 2008–09, 2009–10, 2015–16, 2016–17
Primorje Rijeka
 LEN Champions League runners-up: 2011–12
Croatian Championship: 2013–14
 Adriatic League: 2012–13, 2013–14
Croatian Cup: 2012–13, 2013–14
Olympiacos
LEN Champions League: 2017–18 ;runners-up: 2018–19
Greek Championship:  2017–18, 2018–19
Greek Cup: 2017–18, 2018–19
Greek Super Cup: 2018

Awards
MVP of the 2013–14 Adriatic League with Primorje Rijeka
Top Scorer of the 2016–17 Adriatic League with Jug Dubrovnik

See also
 Croatia men's Olympic water polo team records and statistics
 List of Olympic champions in men's water polo
 List of Olympic medalists in water polo (men)
 List of World Aquatics Championships medalists in water polo

References

External links
 

1986 births
Living people
Sportspeople from Dubrovnik
Croatian male water polo players
Water polo drivers
Water polo players at the 2012 Summer Olympics
Medalists at the 2012 Summer Olympics
Olympic gold medalists for Croatia in water polo
World Aquatics Championships medalists in water polo
Competitors at the 2013 Mediterranean Games
Mediterranean Games medalists in water polo
Mediterranean Games gold medalists for Croatia
Olympiacos Water Polo Club players
Water polo players at the 2020 Summer Olympics
Expatriate water polo players
Croatian expatriate sportspeople in Malta
Croatian expatriate sportspeople in Greece